The 1905 Georgia Tech Yellow Jackets baseball team represented the Georgia Tech Yellow Jackets of the Georgia Institute of Technology in the 1905 college baseball season.  Craig Day pitched 12 complete games. The game of the year was the victory over Duke and Arthur Bradsher.

Schedule and results

Notes

References

Georgia Tech Golden Tornado
Georgia Tech Yellow Jackets baseball seasons
1905 in sports in Georgia (U.S. state)